Wilkowice  is a village in the administrative district of Gmina Lipno, within Leszno County, Greater Poland Voivodeship, in west-central Poland.

In 2016, the village had a population of 2,570.

References

Wilkowice